Paweł Mirosław Olkowski (born 13 February 1990) is a Polish professional footballer who plays as a right-back for Ekstraklasa club Górnik Zabrze. Besides Poland, he has played in Germany, England, and Turkey.

Club career
Born in Ozimek, Olkowski started his senior career at Gwarek Zabrze. In July 2010, he was loaned to GKS Katowice on a one-year deal.

In July 2011, he joined Górnik Zabrze on a three-year contract.

On 1 July 2014, Olkowski joined German club 1. FC Köln on a free transfer.

On 10 July 2018, he joined Football League Championship side Bolton Wanderers on a two-year contract. He made his debut for Bolton on 4 August 2018 when starting Wanderers 2-1 victory over West Bromwich Albion at The Hawthorns. He also started the 2-2 draw against Bristol City, grabbing an assist in a positive performance.

On 9 July 2019, Olkowski joined Turkish club Gazişehir Gaziantep.

On 27 May 2022, it was announced he would return to Górnik Zabrze, signing a two-year contract with an extension option.

International career
Olkowski has represented Poland at under-19 and under-21 levels.

On 15 November 2013 he made his senior debut for the Poland national team in a friendly, starting in a 0–2 loss against Slovakia.

Career Statistics

References

External links
 
 

Living people
1990 births
People from Ozimek
Sportspeople from Opole Voivodeship
Association football defenders
Polish footballers
Poland international footballers
Poland under-21 international footballers
Polish expatriate footballers
GKS Katowice players
Górnik Zabrze players
1. FC Köln players
Bolton Wanderers F.C. players
Gaziantepspor footballers
Ekstraklasa players
Bundesliga players
English Football League players
Süper Lig players
Expatriate footballers in Germany
Expatriate footballers in England
Expatriate footballers in Turkey
Polish expatriate sportspeople in Germany
Polish expatriate sportspeople in England
Polish expatriate sportspeople in Turkey